Jennifer Paige ( Scoggins; born September 3, 1973) is an American singer best known for her international number one pop hit "Crush" (1998), as well as other charted songs including "Sober" (1999) and "Always You" (1999), from her debut album, Jennifer Paige.

Early life 
Paige was born Jennifer Scoggins on September 3, 1973, in Marietta, Georgia, a suburb of Atlanta. She is of English descent. At the age of five she began singing at local coffeehouses and restaurants with her older brother, Chance.

At the age of 17, she toured the country with a top 40 covers act, Vivid Image, and eventually relocated to Los Angeles where she landed an internship with Mountain Dew. In August 1996, she performed in her hometown, Atlanta, in front of 50,000 people at the Olympic Games with the ten-piece covers band, Joe's Band. The same year, Paige teamed up with producer Andy Goldmark. They began with a dance version of Aretha Franklin's classic, "Chain of Fools". The record instantly came to the attention of the German indie label Edel Records, whose president, Jonathan First, was searching for a fresh-faced pop act to establish overseas presence. He was so impressed by Paige's talent that he flew to Los Angeles and gave her a recording contract.

Career

Debut single 
Jennifer's career as a Billboard 100 pop singer began with her first single, "Crush". The song, written by Andy Goldmark, Mark Mueller and Cosgrove & Clark was initially played by KIIS-FM in Los Angeles in April, 1998 and went on to be the most-requested song on the radio station that summer. It ultimately became a Top 3 Billboard chart hit in the U.S., logged 17 weeks in Billboard magazine's Top 10 and went to #1 in Australia, Canada and New Zealand.

Debut album 
Her debut album, Jennifer Paige, was released in August 1998, and consisted of guitar-driven mid-tempo songs such as "Questions", "Between You and Me", "Get to Me", and "Just to Have You". Critics took notice of her voice, and Billboard magazine declared that "Paige succeeds in the nearly impossible task of oozing smouldering sensuality without resorting to typical groans and moans; instead, she uses her notably flexible vocal range to convey the emotion of the tune. As a result, she breathes a refreshing intensity into the song."

The lead single, "Crush", was a hit, and was followed by two other singles, "Sober" and "Always You", the latter reaching #6 on the Billboard Dance Chart.

In the summer of 2000, Paige recorded a new song for the soundtrack of the film Autumn in New York, called "Beautiful".

Positively Somewhere 
Paige toured the world, sang at the Vatican (though Pope John Paul II was not present), and performed at the World Music Awards. Her second album, Positively Somewhere, was anchored by the single "These Days", and was released in September 2001 in United States. It was not noticed until its European and Asian release in the summer of 2002, due to bad timing and a lack of promotion by her American label.

The European release launched a modest hit, "Stranded". The single made an instant impact on radio in countries such as Germany, Italy, Poland, Spain, and Scandinavia. Positively Somewhere cracked the Top 10 in Japan and both singles became radio hits across Asia.

Flowers: The Jennifer Paige Hits Collection 
In 2003, Edel released Flowers: The Jennifer Paige Hits Collection as a result of her parting ways with her record label. In October of the same year, Paige admitted she was no longer with either Hollywood Records or Edel Records. Paige continued writing for other artists, and compiling songs for a new studio effort. In April 2006, "The Calling", was chosen by Lifetime Television for their made-for-TV movie, Augusta, Gone, based on the book of the same name. The song was written by Paige and co-writer/producer Chris Landon of Loudnoize Entertainment.

Best Kept Secret 
Paige began writing and recording her follow-up to Positively Somewhere in Ibiza, Spain. In 2007, Paige signed a record deal with indie company Glor Music Production. The album, titled Best Kept Secret, was released on April 25, 2008, in Germany, Austria and Switzerland. The first single "Wasted" was released in March, experiencing success in Italy. Paige's official website announced "Underestimated" to be the second single from the album, and a music video for the single shortly followed. The third single was "Ta Voix (The Calling)" (duet with Lââm).

The album was re-released as a deluxe edition on November 20, 2009, featuring additional songs, including the new single, "Beautiful Lie" with Nick Carter, and a new version of "Crush" remixed by DJ Kore sung in French.

Paige & Palermo (The Fury) 
In 2010, Paige announced that she had formed a band called "The Fury" together with Coury Palermo. Their first single "Silent Night" was released on iTunes on November 30, 2010, and their second Christmas single "Have Yourself a Merry Little Christmas" in 2011. In 2012, the duo changed their band name to Paige & Palermo and their debut EP "STAY" was released digitally on June 4, 2013, followed by their second EP "GO" which was released in August.

Holiday 
She released her first Christmas album, Holiday on November 12, 2012. It contained Paige's original songs and new arrangements of classic Christmas songs.

Fundraising campaign through Kickstarter for the album Starflower 
In 2012, she co-wrote Smash Mouth's first single "Magic" for their album Magic. On November 19, she released a new single, Everything Is Better, to celebrate 30,000 likes on her official Facebook.

In 2015, she released Is It Ever Enough on her YouTube channel. In the same time, she launched a fundraising campaign to produce her upcoming album Starflower through Kickstarter. In December 2016, her song Let Me Love You, was included in the compilation Nashville Indie Spotlight 2017.
The album was released on March 31, 2017, while the lead single The Devil's in the Details was released on February 17, 2017.

Influences 
Paige has said that she has been influenced by singers such as Annie Lennox, Mariah Carey, Sade, George Michael and Etta James.

Awards and nominations 
{| class=wikitable
|-
! Year !! Awards !! Work !! Category !! Result !! Ref.
|-
| 1999
| RSH Gold Awards
| Herself
| Best Newcomer
| 
|

Discography

Studio albums

Compilations 
 Flowers (The Hits Collection) (2003)

Singles

Compilations

As featured performer

Soundtracks

Writing credits

Filmography 
1999: Tumbleweeds
2002: The Country Bears

References

External links 

1973 births
Living people
American people of English descent
American sopranos
Musicians from Marietta, Georgia
Musicians from Atlanta
American women pop singers
American pop rock singers
American child singers
20th-century American women singers
21st-century American women singers
20th-century American singers
21st-century American singers